Creatures of Habit is an illustrated novel based on the Buffy the Vampire Slayer television series.

Story description

A new clubbing experience is emerging in Sunnydale. DJs are mixing up music, drugs, and blood. One of Spike's old friends is encouraging teens in Sunnydale at some underground raves. He hopes to transform the way vampires can experience the joys of blood-drinking. Buffy and the Scooby Gang try to stop this euphoric feeding, before it is too late for Dawn and others.

Continuity

Supposed to be in Buffy season 6, before Withdrawal. Takes place after the TV episode "Life Serial" and before the episode "Once More, With Feeling".  Buffy has recently come back to life, Giles has returned upon learning this, and Spike is the only one aware that Buffy had been in some kind of heaven, not hell, dimension prior to being brought back by the Scooby Gang.

Canonical issues

Buffy comics such as this one are not usually considered by fans as canonical. Some fans consider them stories from the imaginations of authors and artists, while other fans consider them as taking place in an alternative fictional reality. However unlike fan fiction, overviews summarising their story, written early in the writing process, were 'approved' by both Fox and Joss Whedon (or his office), and the books were therefore later published as officially Buffy merchandise. 

Comics based on Buffy the Vampire Slayer